Major William Martin  was a persona invented by British Military Intelligence for Operation Mincemeat, the Second World War deception plan that lured German forces to Greece prior to the Allied invasion of Sicily. Also known as "the man who never was", Martin's personal details were created to lend credence to the scheme, which involved a body, dressed as a British officer and carrying secret documents, to wash up on shores of neutral Spain, apparently the victim of an air crash. It was intended that these documents, containing information that suggested an Allied assault on Greece was planned, should fall into the hands of German intelligence.

The identity of the body employed as Major Martin was kept secret during and after the war, and was the source of some speculation. The body was identified in 1996 as that of Glyndwr Michael, a Welsh homeless man, and recognised as such by the Commonwealth War Graves Commission.

Operation Mincemeat

The aim of Operation Mincemeat was to allow documents pertaining to Allied operations in the Mediterranean to fall into the hands of German Military Intelligence, to mislead them regarding the target of the intended invasion of southern Europe. In order to convince the Germans of the veracity of the documents, it was decided they would be on the body of a Marine officer, which would also carry documents and personal items attesting to his identity. 
Finding a usable cadaver had been difficult, as indiscreet inquiries would cause talk, and it was impossible to tell a dead man's next of kin what the body was wanted for. A suitable body was identified, and considerable effort was made to create Martin's persona: identity card and discs, personal letters, a photograph of a fiancée, St. Christopher medal, some bills and theatre tickets.

On 30 April 1943, Lt. Norman Jewell, captain of the submarine , read the 39th Psalm, and "Martin"'s body was gently pushed into the sea where the tide, aided by the push of the submarine's propellers, would bring it ashore off Huelva on the Spanish Atlantic coast.

Attached to Martin's body was a briefcase containing secret documents that had been fabricated by the British Security Service. The purpose was to make German intelligence (which was known to have operatives in Huelva) think he had been a courier delivering documents to a British general. The documents were crafted to deceive the Germans into thinking that the British were preparing to invade Greece and Sardinia, rather than Sicily.

Martin's body was picked up by a fisherman and, as planned, the documents he was carrying found their way into the hands of German Intelligence. The operation was judged a success, as the invasion of Sicily was accomplished more easily and quickly than its planners had expected.

Identity

Ewen Montagu's account
Ewen Montagu, the officer in charge of Operation Mincemeat, was faced with the task of finding a body to give substance to the persona of William Martin. In this he was assisted by Bentley Purchase, coroner of St Pancras District. Several different accounts of this have been given. In Montagu's book, The Man Who Never Was, written in 1953, he states that in 1942 there was no shortage of bodies, but none they felt they could take. He states that the body of a young man who had died of pneumonia was found, and that permission to use the body was given. The body was released on the condition that the man's real identity would never be revealed.

However, historian Ben Macintyre states that the dead man's parents had died and no known relatives were found. Anna Pukas states that neither of Montagu's claims, that the man died from pneumonia and that the family had been contacted and permission obtained, were true.

Glyndwr Michael

Montagu stated that the body was released on the condition that the man's real identity would never be revealed. However, in 1996, Roger Morgan, an amateur historian from London, uncovered evidence in the Public Record Office that the identity of the corpse was a Welshman named Glyndwr Michael.

Michael was born in Aberbargoed in Monmouthshire in South Wales. Before leaving the town, he held part-time jobs as a gardener and labourer. His father Thomas, a coal miner, killed himself when Michael was 15, and his mother died when he was 31. Homeless, friendless, depressed, and with no money, Michael drifted to London where he lived on the streets.

Michael was found in an abandoned warehouse close to King's Cross, seriously ill from ingesting rat poison that contained phosphorus. Two days later, he died at age 34 in St Pancras Hospital. His death may have been suicide, although he might have simply been hungry, as the poison he ingested was a paste smeared on bread crusts to attract rats.

After being ingested, phosphide reacts with hydrochloric acid in the stomach, generating phosphine, a highly toxic gas. Purchase explained, "This dose was not sufficient to kill him outright, and its only effect was to so impair the functioning of the liver that he died a little time afterwards". When Purchase obtained Michael's body, it was identified as being in suitable condition for a man who would appear to have floated ashore several days after having died at sea by hypothermia and drowning.

John Melville
After the identification of Michael as Major Martin, doubts began to surface. It seemed odd that an operative as meticulous as Montagu would risk the success of the operation by using a body of a man neither physically fit (as might be expected of a Marine officer) nor having died in the manner suggested (drowned, or as a result of an air crash). Montagu formally states in his book that, in 1942, there was no shortage of bodies, but none they felt they could take. He also states that he feared they may have to steal a body ("do a Burke and Hare"), before the body of a young man who had died of pneumonia, and for whom permission to use the body was given, could be found.

From this Montagu dismissed the need for physical fitness ("he doesn't need to look like an officer – only a staff officer") and the difference in cause of death ("If a post mortem examination was made by someone who had formed the preconceived idea that the death was probably due to drowning there was little likelihood that the difference between this liquid, in lungs that had started to decompose, and sea water would be noticed").

However, in 2004 John and Noreen Steele suggested that Montagu resolved these objections by using the body of a serviceman, and pointed to the accidental loss of HMS Dasher in the Clyde in March 1943, and the loss of 349 of her crew. They argued that such a person would be of military fitness (which Michael was not) and had died in a marine accident (as Michael had not); also that there would be little difficulty in obtaining identity papers and that the body would be considerably fresher than one that had been on ice for three months.

The submarine designated for the mission was HMS Seraph, which departed from the Clyde on 19 May 1943. Before the mission set off from the Clyde, Montagu described having to drive from London with the body while a Scottish source for the body would have made this task easier.

The Steeles named the person whose body was used as John Melville; in recognition of this, in 2004 a memorial service was held on the present-day Dasher, a patrol craft, at which John Melville's daughter was present. However the Royal Navy later said that there had been a mistake and that the crew had been given wrong information ahead of the service.

Tom Martin
Another investigation into the Dasher affair was published in 2003 by Colin Gribbons, drawing similar conclusions to the Steeles'. However, Gribbons identified the body used in Operation Mincemeat as that of yet another person, Tom Martin, a sailor who perished in the Dasher incident.

Commemoration

The body was buried, with full military honours, as Major William Martin. His grave, No.1886, is in the San Marco section of the cemetery of Nuestra Señora, in Huelva, Spain. The headstone reads:

William Martin, born 29 March 1907, died 24 April 1943, beloved son of John Glyndwr Martin and the late Antonia Martin of Cardiff, Wales, Dulce et Decorum est pro Patria Mori, R.I.P.Ben Macintyre, Operation Mincemeat; How a Dead Man and a Bizarre Plan Fooled the Nazis and Assured an Allied Victory, Harmony Books, Chapter 8

In 1998, after the British government identified the body as Glyndwr Michael, a new inscription was added to the gravestone:

Glyndwr Michael Served as Major William Martin, RM

A plaque commemorating Glyndwr Michael has been added to the war memorial in Aberbargoed. It is headed  (translation – "The Man Who Never Was").

Glyndwr Michael has been commemorated on stage in Cardboard Citizens' 2009 play Mincemeat and Spitlip's Operation Mincemeat musical, as well as on film in The Man Who Never Was (1956) and in the 2021 production Operation Mincemeat.

References

External links
 
CWGC entry for "Nuestra Señora de la Soledad" Cemetery

Operation Mincemeat
British people of World War II
Burials in Andalusia
Nonexistent people
Welsh people